San Giuseppe or St Joseph is a 17th-century, late-Baroque-style, Roman Catholic church, located in Piazza del Popolo in San Severino Marche, region of Marche, Italy.

History
The church was built in 1628 under the patronage of the Tinti family, and renovated in 1768 by Vincenzo Tinti utilizing the architect Carlo Maggi.

References

17th-century Roman Catholic church buildings in Italy
Baroque architecture in Marche
Roman Catholic churches in San Severino Marche